Zannone Lighthouse is an active lighthouse located in the northern part of Zannone in the Pontine Islands on the Tyrrhenian Sea.

Description
The tower is painted white and the lantern dome in grey metallic.

The lighthouse is completely automated and managed by the Marina Militare with the identification code number 2262 E.F.

See also
List of lighthouses in Italy

References

External links
 Servizio Fari Marina Militare 
 Picture of Punta Varo Lighthouse Marina Militare

Lighthouses in Italy
Buildings and structures in Lazio
Transport in Lazio